Vietnam competed at the 2000 Summer Olympics in Sydney, Australia. Vietnam was represented by seven athletes in four sports, and won their first Olympic medal.

Medalists

Results by event

Athletics
Men's 100m
 Lương Tích Thiện
 Round 1 – 10.85 (did not advance)

Women's 100m Hurdles
 Vũ Bích Hường
 Round 1 – 13.61 (did not advance)

Shooting
 Nguyễn Trung Hiếu

Swimming
Men's 200m Breaststroke
 Nguyễn Ngọc Anh
 Preliminary Heat – 02:29.54 (did not advance)

Women's 400m Individual Medley
 Nguyễn Thị Hương
 Preliminary Heat – 05:26.56 (did not advance)

Taekwondo
 Nguyễn Thị Xuân Mai
 Trần Hiếu Ngân (SILVER MEDAL)

References
Wallechinsky, David (2004). The Complete Book of the Summer Olympics (Athens 2004 Edition). Toronto, Canada. . 
International Olympic Committee (2001). The Results. Retrieved 12 November 2005.
Sydney Organising Committee for the Olympic Games (2001). Official Report of the XXVII Olympiad Volume 1: Preparing for the Games. Retrieved 20 November 2005.
Sydney Organising Committee for the Olympic Games (2001). Official Report of the XXVII Olympiad Volume 2: Celebrating the Games. Retrieved 20 November 2005.
Sydney Organising Committee for the Olympic Games (2001). The Results. Retrieved 20 November 2005.
International Olympic Committee Web Site

Nations at the 2000 Summer Olympics
2000
2000 in Vietnamese sport